This Is My Love is a 2015 South Korean television series starring Joo Jin-mo and Kim Sa-rang. It aired on JTBC from May 29 to July 18, 2015 on Fridays and Saturdays at 20:40 (KST) time slot for 16 episodes.

Synopsis
Top actor Ji Eun-ho (Joo Jin-mo) hires ghostwriter Seo Jung-eun (Kim Sa-rang) to write his autobiography in 2015. Eun-ho is tense, irritable and difficult to work with, but Jung-eun finds her assignment fascinating because Eun-ho claims he began acting not because he wanted to become a star but because he thought being in the limelight would help him find his first love, Ji Eun-dong. Eun-ho and Eun-dong's complicated romantic history has spanned two decades, and he's convinced that he can never love anyone else. As Jung-eun helps him remember Eun-dong and why he lost her, Eun-ho (whose birth name is Park Hyun-soo) looks back on his memories of her, from when they met in 1995 when he was seventeen.

Cast
 Joo Jin-mo as Ji Eun-ho / Park Hyun-soo
 Park Jin-young as 17-year-old Park Hyun-soo
 Baek Sung-hyun as 27-year-old Park Hyun-soo
 Kim Sa-rang as Seo Jung-eun / Ji Eun-dong
 Lee Ja-in as 13-year-old Ji Eun-dong
 Yoon So-hee as 23-year-old Ji Eun-dong
 Kim Tae-hoon as Choi Jae-ho
 Na In-woo as 24-year-old Choi Jae-ho
 Kim Yoo-ri as Jo Seo-ryung
 Kim Yoon-seo as Park Hyun-ah
 Lee Young-ran as Hyun-soo's mother
 Jung Dong-hwan as Hyun-soo's father
 Nam Kyung-eup as Coach Seo
 Seo Kap-sook as Madam Park
 Joo Min-kyung as Nan-shil	
 Park Min-soo as Choi Ra-il
 Shin Rin-ah as Yoo Min-ah (Hyun-ah's daughter)
 Mi-jung as Madam Park
 Kim Yong-hee as Lee Hyun-bal
 Kim Hyung-kyu as young Lee Hyun-bal
 Kim Min-ho as Go Dong-gyu
 Kim Mi-jin as Go Mi-soon
 Jang Ki-yong as Lee Suk-tae

Original soundtrack

Part 1

Part 2

Part 3

Part 4

Awards and nominations

References

External links
  
 

2015 South Korean television series debuts
2015 South Korean television series endings
JTBC television dramas
South Korean romance television series
South Korean melodrama television series
Television series by Drama House